"Tonefloating : The Use of Ashes vs Steven Wilson" is a seven-inch LP single released by Dutch record label Tonefloat in order to promote two of their most recognized signed artists. It was recorded during an acoustic concert in Delft, the Netherlands on Feb 27, 2000 where both artists performed. There are about 200 copies in existence which were given to people attending the concert.

The Steven Wilson side of the single features a demo recorded in July 1999 of a song written for Porcupine Tree but not recorded yet at the time. That song was later included in the single for Shesmovedon and in the compilation album Recordings.

Track listing

 A/ The Use of Ashes - Rainbird (demo)
 B/ Steven Wilson - Cure for Optimism (edit) (3:58)

Porcupine Tree songs
2000 singles